The Choč Mountains (in Slovak, Chočské vrchy) are a range of mountains in north-central Slovakia, a portion of the Fatra-Tatra Area of the Inner Western Carpathians. The range is 24 kilometers long and on average only 4 kilometers wide. Highest peak is Veľký Choč at 1 611 metres above sea level.

Location 
Choč Mountains are bordered:
 in the northwest by the Oravská Highlands,
 in the northeast by the valley of the Podtatranská Brázda,
 in the east by the Western Tatras,
 the south by the basin of the Podtatranská kotlina, 
 in the southwest by Greater Fatra

Highest Peaks 
 Veľký Choč, 1611 metres
 Malý Choč, 1465 metres
 Prosečné, 1371 metres
 Holica, 1340 metres
 Lomná, 1278 metres

See also 
 Tatra Mountains
 Tourism in Slovakia

References 

Mountain ranges of Slovakia
Mountain ranges of the Western Carpathians